Wheelin' and Dealin is an album by drummer Frank Butler which was recorded in 1978 and released on the Xanadu label.

Reception

The AllMusic review by Scott Yanow stated: "Missing are the longer drum solos of the earlier album; instead the focus is primarily on the two saxes... it will especially appeal to lovers of hard bop".

Track listing 
 "Wheelin' and Dealin'" (Teddy Edwards) - 6:21
 "I Got It Bad (and That Ain't Good)/Tenderly" (Duke Ellington, Paul Francis Webster/Walter Gross, Jack Lawrence) - 8:14
 "Four" (Miles Davis) - 7:29 
 "Secret Love" (Sammy Fain, Paul Francis Webster) - 5:40  
 "My Cherie Amour" (Stevie Wonder, Henry Cosby, Sylvia Moy) - 6:40  
 "Mr. October" (Dolo Coker) - 6:55

Personnel 
Frank Butler - drums
Teddy Edwards, Joe Farrell - tenor saxophone 
Dolo Coker - piano
Monty Budwig - bass

References 

Frank Butler (musician) albums
1978 albums
Xanadu Records albums
Albums produced by Don Schlitten